Adriatic Bridge is a six-lane road and tram bridge over the Sava River in Zagreb, Croatia.

References

Bridges completed in 1981
Bridges in Zagreb
Novi Zagreb
Bridges over the Sava in Croatia
1981 establishments in Yugoslavia